Chandi Di Var (Gurmukhi: ਚੰਡੀ ਦੀ ਵਾਰ lit. "Chandi's deeds") is a composition written by Guru Gobind Singh, included in the 5th chapter of Dasam Granth. It is based on an episode from the Sanskrit work Markandeya Purana, and describes the conflict between the Gods and the Demons. In the ballad, the supreme goddess (see Chandi) is transformed into a liberating divine power in the form of sword, that crushes perpetuators of falsehood.

The first part of the text, Chandi Charitra Ukti Bilas, states it is retelling the Markandeya Purana story, where Durga fights a shape shifting buffalo demon Mahishasura and slays the evil demon and his companions. The second part repeats the same story, while part three of the text is a retelling of the Durga Saptasati. The composition has been a significant part of Sikh culture, state Pashaura Singh and Louis Fenech, with its opening verses being a part of "frequently recited ardas prayer or petition".

Nomenclature
The text has historically been referred to by several names. These include:
Var Durga ki (IAST: Vāra Durgā Kī), meaning the "Ballad of Durga"
Var Sri Bhagauti Ji ki (Vāra Srī Bhagautī Jī Kī), meaning the "Ballad of Revered Bhagauti"
Chandi di Var (Chandī Dī Vāra), meaning the "Ballad of Chandi"

Authorship
Chandi di Var was written by Guru Gobind Singh at Paonta sahib. According to early Sikh historians such as Bhai Koer Singh Kalal, as mentioned in Gurbilas Patshahi 10 (1751), Chandi di Vaar was written by Guru Gobind Singh at Anandpur Sahib. Various other Sikh historians and scholars like Giani Ditt Singh, Professor Sahib Singh, Giani Gian Singh, Ratan Singh Bhangu, Kavi Santokh Singh also supported this fact.

Role in Sikh Liturgy
{{Quote box
| quote = <poem>
ਪ੍ਰਿਥਮ ਭਗੌਤੀ ਸਿਮਰਿ ਕੈ ਗੁਰੁ ਨਾਨਕ ਲਈਂ ਧਿਆਇ

Prathami bhagautī simar kai Gurū Nānakalaī dhiāi.

First I remember bhagauti (Wahguru in a feminine form'), then I remember Guru Nanak.
</poem>
| source = — First line of the Chandi di Var, Guru Gobind Singh
| bgcolor = #ffd27f
| align = right
}}
 The first stanza of the Sikh ardās, an invocation to God and the nine Gurus preceding Gobind Singh, is from Chandi di Var. The "Bhagauti"-related sections from Chandi di Var is a mandatory part of an ardas that is a part of worship service in a Gurdwara (Sikh temple), daily rituals such as the opening the Guru Granth Sahib for prakash (morning light) or closing it for sukhasan'' (night bedroom) in larger Gurdwaras, closing of congregational worship in smaller Gurdwaras, rites-of-passages such as with the naming of child or wedding or the cremation of a Sikh, daily prayer by devout Sikhs and any significant Sikh ceremonies.

 Read daily by Nihang and Namdharis.

See also
 Ardas
 Chandi
 Khanda
 Dasam Granth
 Sikh scriptures

References
opi

External links
 Sri Dasam Granth Sahib: Questions and Answers: The book on Sri Dasam Granth Sahib 
 Life of Guru Gobind Singh
 The Tenth Guru

Dasam Granth